Turismo Nacional, often referred to as Turismo Nacional BR, is a touring car racing series based in Brazil which is promoted by Vicar. The series uses modified production cars from the Brazilian market. Turismo Nacional was created in 2013 and has been promoted by Vicar since 2021. The championship consists of six distinct classes: A, B, Super, PRO, Elite, and Senior. The series is composed of six overall rounds which are subdivided into four 20-minute races.

Classes 
In 2018, the class system was updated from before to include the following classes for cars:

 Class 1: Cars that have been in the market for less than three years;

 Class 2: Cars that have been in the market for more than three years.

And the following categories for drivers, which depend on the experience level:

 Senior
 B

 A
 Elite
 Super
 PRO

Models 
Below is a list of models which are homologated to race in the series.

Specifications

Engine 
Cars in Turismo Nacional are powered by a 2000cc (2L) Inline 4. The engine is powered by ethanol.

Transmission 
The transmission used in the cars is a 6-speed semi-automatic gearbox which is manufactured by Vicar's Stock Tech.

Champions

TN Pro

Super

Elite

A

B

Senior

See also 

 Stock Car Pro Series
 Stock Series
 F4 Brazilian Championship

References 

Touring car racing series
2013 establishments in Brazil
Sports leagues established in 2013